Schlachtgeschwader 2 (SG 2) Immelmann  was a Luftwaffe dive-bomber wing of World War II. It was named after Max Immelmann, the first German pilot to earn the Pour le Mérite.

This close-support Stuka unit fought principally in the southern sector of the Eastern Front in places like Stalingrad and the Caucasus. The early two Schlachtgeschwader 1 and 2 were abbreviated SchlG, the reformed Stukageschwader in 1943 were abbreviated SG. The 4 SchlG Gruppen were integrated into the former Stuka (StG) and Schnellkampfgeschwader (SKG) to form SG 2, 4, 77 and 10.

History
Schlachtgeschwader 2 "Immelmann" was formed on 18 October 1943 from Sturzkampfgeschwader 2. I./SG 2 was I./StG 2, II./SG 2 was created from the II./Schlachtgeschwader 1, III./SG 2 was II./StG 2.

In 1941, Stukageschwader 2 was transferred to the Eastern Front. On 26 June 1941, Stuka Geschwader 2 attacked 60 Soviet tanks south of Grodno, and later discovered that only one T-34 had been knocked out.  During the rest of 1941 and 1942, the inadequacy of dive-bombing tanks became more evident. The most effective way to assault tanks from the air would appear with SG 2 in 1943.

On 23 September 1941, StG 2 attacked the Baltic Red Banner Fleet docked in Kronstadt harbour. During the attack, Oblt. Rudel crippled the soviet Battleship Marat with a 1000 kg bomb.

In late 1942, a Panzerjäger Staffel was formed within StG 2, which enjoyed such success that, after October 1943, a similar unit was added to each Stuka Geschwader. During the spring of 1943 SG 2 worked up with modified Ju 87 G-1 'tank-busters' armed with two Rheinmetall-Borsig 37mm Flak 18 guns mounted under each wing. Prototypes were first used against Russian landing craft in the Black Sea area. In March 1943 Rudel knocked out the first tank with the new Stuka.
The Ju 87 G-2, based on the Ju 87 D-5 with extended wingtips, replaced the Ju 87 G-1 during 1944. This was a dedicated tank-buster, with no secondary dive-bombing role.

While II./SG 2, formerly II./SchlG 1, had been equipped with Focke-Wulf Fw 190 since late 1942, I./SG 2 was converted to the new machine in June 1944. III./SG 2 kept on flying the outdated Junkers Ju 87 until the end of World War II. By early 1944 II./SG 2 was covering the gradual Wehrmacht withdrawal around Kirovograd with II./JG 52.

As one of only two F w190 equipped ground-attack unit on the Eastern Front, II./SG 2 took part in the 6-month Crimean campaign during 1944, and in addition to its usual ground-attack work flew numerous interception sorties, claiming some 247 Soviet aircraft shot down. By May 1944 the depleted II./SG 2 withdrew to Romania.

By April 1945 Stab and II./SG 2 were based at Kummer, in northern Bohemia, while I./SG 2 was in Austria, and III./SG 2 near Prague.

At the end of the war, the commanding officer and a few other pilots flew their aircraft west and surrendered to the American forces. The transport column traveling on roads was destroyed.

Commanding officers
Oberstleutnant Hans-Karl Stepp, 18 October 1943 – 30 September 1944
Oberstleutnant Hans-Ulrich Rudel, 1 October 1944 – 8 February 1945
Major Friedrich Lang (acting), 9 February 1945 – 13 March 1945
Oberstleutnant Kurt Kuhlmey (acting), 14 March 1945 – 20 April 1945
Oberst Hans-Ulrich Rudel, April 1945 – 8th of May 1945

Bibliography

 
 
 .
 
 
 
 
 

Luftwaffe Wings
Military units and formations established in 1943
Military units and formations disestablished in 1945